Jining South railway station is a railway station of Jingbao Railway, Jier Railway and Jitong railway. The station is located in Jining, Ulanqab, Inner Mongolia, China.

History
The station opened in 1921.

References

Railway stations in Inner Mongolia
Railway stations in China opened in 1921